Leukocyte-associated immunoglobulin-like receptor 1 is a protein that in humans is encoded by the LAIR1 gene. LAIR1 has also been designated as CD305 (cluster of differentiation 305).

Function 

The protein encoded by this gene is an inhibitory receptor found on peripheral mononuclear cells, including NK cells, T cells, and B cells. Inhibitory receptors regulate the immune response to prevent lysis of cells recognized as self. The gene is a member of both the immunoglobulin superfamily and the leukocyte-associated inhibitory receptor family. The gene maps to a region of 19q13.4 called the leukocyte receptor cluster, which contains at least 29 genes encoding leukocyte-expressed receptors of the immunoglobulin superfamily.

Interactions 

LAIR1 has been shown to interact with PTPN11 and PTPN6.

References

Further reading

External links 
 
 

Clusters of differentiation
Immunoglobulin superfamily